In Australian aboriginal mythology (specifically: Karadjeri), Dilga is a goddess of fertility and growth, and the mother of the Bagadjimbiri.  She avenged their deaths at the hands of Ngariman by drowning him in her milk.

Australian Aboriginal goddesses
Fertility goddesses